Vasishthiputra Pulumavi (Brahmi: 𑀯𑀸𑀲𑀺𑀣𑀺𑀧𑀼𑀢 𑀧𑀼𑀎𑀼𑀫𑀸𑀯𑀺, Vāsiṭhiputa Puḷumāvi) was a Satavahana king, and the son of Gautamiputra Satakarni. The new consensus for his reign is ca. 85-125 CE, although it was earlier dated variously: 110–138 CE or 130–159 CE. He is also referred to as Vasishthiputra Sri Pulumavi. Ptolemy, the second century writer, refers to Pulumavi as Siriptolemaios, a contemporary of the Western satrap, Chastana.

The capital of Sri Pulumavi is reported to have been at Paithan.

Coinage
Some of the lead coins of Pulumavi depict two-masted Indian ships, a testimony to the seafaring and trading capabilities of the Satavahanas during the 1st-2nd century CE. During his rule, Gautami Balasri, the mother of Gautamiputra Satakarni, laid an inscription at Nashik. Pulumavi was succeeded by his younger brother Vashishtiputra Satakarni.

Nashik Pandavleni Caves
Near Nashik, Cave No.3 of Pandavleni Caves was built by Queen Gotami Balasiri during the reign of Pulumavi, and also received a dedication by Sri Pulumavi himself. The cave was dedicated to the Samgha. Based on inscription no. 3, the mountain on which the caves are present was known as Mount Tiranhu during the time of Sri Pulumavi and the area around Nashik caves was known as Sudasana, which was a part of district/province known as Govardhana.

Karla caves inscription

On the lintel to the left of the main entrance to the Great Chaitya at Karla Caves, facing the inscription of Nahapana and posterior to it by a generation, there is also an inscription by Satavahana ruler Sri Pulumayi, that is, Vasishthiputra Pulumavi:

References 

Satavahana dynasty
2nd-century Indian monarchs

Book sources